Acklin is a surname. Notable people with the surname include:

 Barbara Acklin (1943–1998), American soul singer
 Donat Acklin (born 1965), Swiss bobsledder
 Guido Acklin (born 1969), Swiss bobsledder

See also
 Acklins, an island and district of the Bahamas

References